The South Branch Penobscot River is a river in Somerset County, Maine. This section of the border runs along the height of land separating the watersheds of the Penobscot River and the Monument River, which feeds into the Saint Lawrence River.
 
The two rivers combine to form the West Branch Penobscot River, which flows east from the outlet of Seboomook Lake.

Canada Falls Lake

The lake created behind the dam in Pittston Academy Grant floods the South Branch Penobscot River westerly into Alder Brook Township and tributary Alder Brook southerly into Soldiertown Township. When full, Canada Falls Lake has the largest surface area of any lake on the South Branch Penobscot River; but the lake is usually drained by late summer, and remains low until filled by snowmelt the following spring. Brook trout spawning upstream of the lake and in tributaries Hale Brook, Mullen Brook, and Cunningham Brook spend the warmer months in cool spring seepage areas in the main river channel through the lake.

See also
List of rivers of Maine

References

Maine Streamflow Data from the USGS
Maine Watershed Data From Environmental Protection Agency

Tributaries of the Penobscot River
Rivers of Somerset County, Maine
Rivers of Maine